Passerby may refer to:
 Passerby (EP), a 2003 recording by Flyleaf (band)
 Passerby, a 2009 EP by Allie Moss
 Passerby (Luluc album), a 2014 album by Luluc
 "Passerby", a 2012 single by Grinspoon
 Passerby, early name of the band Flyleaf
 The Passerby (TV series)
 The Passerby, English title of the 1951 film La Passante
 The Passerby (1982 film)
 Mr. Passerby, a character in the play Mr A's Amazing Maze Plays

See also 
 "The Passersby", an episode of the TV series The Twilight Zone
 Passer by (disambiguation)